Husvær is an island group in the municipality of Herøy in Nordland county, Norway. The islands have one main road connecting several of the populated islands together with a ferry link at the eastern end. The main populated islands are Husvær, Prestøya, and Brasøya. Husvær Chapel offers several worship services each year.

The area around Husvær is quite nice for tourism, especially for boating and camping.

See also
List of islands of Norway

References

Islands of Nordland
Herøy, Nordland